William of Maleval, also known as William the Hermit
or William the Great, was 
a French Christian and the founder of the Catholic congregation of Williamites, an early branch of the Hermits of St. Augustine. He was beatified in 1202.

Sources
The account of his life, written by his disciple Albert, who lived with him during his last year at Maleval, has been lost. Written accounts of his life by Theodobald, or Thibault, given by the Bollandists, is unreliable because it has been interpolated with the lives of at least two other Williams.

Life
A Frenchman by birth, he spent some years in a dissolute life in the military.  After a number of chapters in which Theodobald confuses him with St. William of Gellone, Duke of Aquitaine, he says that William went to Rome, where he had an interview with Pope Eugene III, who ordered him to make a pilgrimage to Jerusalem in penance for his sins. 

Though Theodobald's account of his interview with the pope does not carry conviction, the fact of this visit and his subsequent pilgrimage to Jerusalem is supported by excerpts from the older life, which are preserved by responsories and antiphons in his liturgical feast Office. He seems to have remained at Jerusalem for one or two years, not nine as Theodobald relates. 

About 1153 he returned to Tuscany, sometimes living as a hermit, sometimes as a member of a religious community. At first he led a hermit's life in a wood near Pisa. He was prevailed upon to undertake the government of a monastery in the area, but being unsuccessful in attempting to reform the monks tepidity and indolence, he retired first to  Monte Pruno, and finally in 1155 in the desert valley of Stabulum Rodis, later known as Maleval, in the territory of Castiglione della Pescaia, Diocese of Grosseto, where he was joined by Albert.

He died on 10 February 1157 (his feast day) and was canonized in 1202. After his death, two of his followers formed the Order of Saint William, which later joined the Augustinians.

Veneration
William is honored by the Augustinians, who founded a number of parishes in the Philippines named for him.  

Other churches include:
Parish of St. William of Maleval, Passi City, Iloilo, Philippines
San Guillermo de Maleval Parish, Iponan, Cagayan de Oro City, Philippines

See also
 Hermits of Saint William

References

Italian Roman Catholic saints
1157 deaths
12th-century Christian saints
Augustinian saints
Year of birth unknown
Place of birth unknown